

Belgium
Belgian Congo 
 Auguste Tilkens, Governor-General of the Belgian Congo (1927–1934)
 Pierre Ryckmans, Governor-General of the Belgian Congo (1934–1946)

France
 French Somaliland – 
 Louis Placide Blacher, Governor of French Somaliland (1932–1934)
 Jules Marcel de Coppet, Governor of French Somaliland (1934–1935)
 Guinea – Joseph Vadier, Lieutenant-Governor of Guinea (1933–1935)

Japan
 Karafuto – Takeshi Imamura, Governor-General of Karafuto (5 July 1932 – 7 May 1938)
 Korea – Kazushige Ugaki, Governor-General of Korea (1931–1936)
 Taiwan – Kenzō Nakagawa, Governor-General of Taiwan (27 May 1932 – September 1936)

Portugal
 Angola – 
 Eduardo Ferreira Viana, High Commissioner of Angola (1931–1934)
 Júlio Garcês de Lencastre, High Commissioner of Angola (1934–1935)

United Kingdom
 India – Freeman Freeman-Thomas, 1st Marquess of Willingdon, Viceroy of India (1931–1936)
 Malta Colony – David Campbell, Governor of Malta (1931–1936)
 Northern Rhodesia – Sir Ronald Storrs, Governor of Northern Rhodesia (1932–1935)
Saint Vincent and the Grenadines – Arthur Francis Grimble, Administrator of Saint Vincent and the Grenadines (1933–1936)

United States
 Philippines – Frank Murphy, Governor-General of the Philippines (1933–1935)
 United States Virgin Islands – Paul Martin Pearson, Governor of the United States Virgin Islands (1931–1935)

Colonial governors
Colonial governors
1934